Tapuy, also spelled tapuey or tapey, is a rice wine produced in the Philippines. It is a traditional beverage originated from Banaue and the Mountain Province, where it is used for important occasions such as weddings, rice harvesting ceremonies, fiestas and cultural fairs. It is produced from either pure glutinous rice or a combination of glutinous and non-glutinous rice together with  roots, ginger extract, and a powdered starter culture locally known as bubod. Tapuy is an Ilocano name. The wine is more commonly called baya or bayah in Igorot languages.

Etymology
Tapuy is derived from Proto-Malayo-Polynesian *tapay ("fermented [food]"), which in turn is derived from Proto-Austronesian * ("fermented [food]"). Derived cognates has come to refer to a wide variety of fermented food throughout Austronesia, including yeasted bread (Tagalog: tinapay) and rice wine. Tapuy is a variant of the widespread Austronesian rice paste or rice wine tapai (or tapay in Philippine languages).

Proto-Malayo-Polynesian *tapay-an also refers to large earthen jars originally used for this fermentation process. Cognates in modern Austronesian languages include tapayan (Tagalog), tepayan (Iban), and tempayan (Javanese and Malay).

Description
The characteristics of tapuy, as in many other rice wines, depend on the process and ingredients used by each manufacturer. However, in general, tapuy is a clear full-bodied wine with a strong alcoholic flavor, moderately sweet and often leaves a lingering taste. The alcohol content is 28 proof or about 14 percent. It has no sulfites (which are preservatives found in other wines) that sometimes cause adverse reactions like hang-over and allergies. Tapuy is also not diluted with water and has no sugar added.

The process of producing commercial tapuy starts with weighing and washing selected rice. Then, the rice is cooked, cooled and inoculated with a natural starter culture, locally known as bubod. After that, a process of natural pre-fermentation and natural fermentation follows. Once the fermentation is completed, the fresh wine can be harvested and pasteurized. After the pasteurization, the rice wine is aged, filtered and clarified before bottling. Finally, bottled rice wine is pasteurized once again before sealing.

Traditions
Once a year, during the Ipitik festival, rice wine brewers from all over the Mountain Province gather together to bring their best rice wine concoctions. The one whole day of merrymaking is filled with wood-carving contests, art exhibits, and  large cook-outs that aim to feed hundreds of people. There are gong players, mostly children who dance while playing a lively beat. Indeed, the tapuy rice wine is deeply rooted in one of the colorful and diverse cultures in the Philippines.

See also
Pangasi

References

External links
 The Philippine Rice Research Institute website
 How to make tapuy
 How to make tapuy starter culture (bubod)

Fermented drinks
Philippine alcoholic drinks
Philippine cuisine
Rice wine